Satharam, also known as Sataram, is a small village located in Mallapur mandal of Karimnagar District of the Indian state of Telangana. Satharam has a population of about 3000 people.

References

Villages in Karimnagar district